Volant may refer to:

Volant (heraldry), an attitude of heraldry, a position of a bird emblazoned as a charge, supporter or crest
Flying and gliding animals
Volant skis, a U.S. ski manufacturer
Volant, Pennsylvania, a small town